Shirdari (also Romanized as Shīrdārī) is a village in Panj Hezareh Rural District, in the Central District of Behshahr County, Mazandaran Province, Iran. At the 2006 census, its population was 78, in 17 families.

References 

Populated places in Behshahr County